Susan Krinard is an author of paranormal romance, science fiction, and fantasy.

Krinard received a BFA in Illustration from the California College of Arts and Crafts. She became inspired to become an author when a close friend of hers read a romantic "Beauty and the Beast"-like excerpt she'd written and suggested she try her hand at romance novels. Prince of Wolves, her first romance novel, sold within a year as part of a three-book contract.  Since then she has been published by HQN, Luna Books, Bantam Books, and Berkley Books.

Krinard's works often build upon one another.  For example, the sister of the male protagonist in her werewolf romance, "Touch Of A Wolf" is the central character in a later novel, "Once A Wolf". Her stories portray paranormal beings, including vampires, werewolves, and extraterrestrials, interacting with and becoming the love interest of human characters.

Her urban fantasy series Midgard, beginning with the first novel Mist was released in July 2013 and the follow-up, Black Ice, was published in August 2014. Battlestorm, the third volume, was released in spring 2016.

Krinard is originally from the Bay area, lived in Toronto in the 1980s, and now lives in New Mexico with her husband.

Bibliography

Fane series
The Forest Lord, Nov 2002 
Lord of the Beasts, Oct 2006 
Lord of Legends, Apr 2009 
Lord of Sin, Sep 2009

Kinsman
Kinsman, Aug 2001 in Out of This World (connected)
Kinsman's Oath, May 2004

Midgard
Freeze Warning, Oct 2013 (prequel)
Mist, July 2013 also in Chicks Kick Butt  
Black Ice, Aug 2014 
Battlestorm, Mar 2016

Nightsiders
Halfway to Dawn, Nov 2012 in Holiday With a Vampire 4
Daysider, Aug 2013 
Nightmaster, Dec 2013 
Night Quest, Feb 2016 
Dark Journey, May 2016

Twenties Werewolf, Vampire Series
Chasing Midnight, Oct 2007 
Dark of the Moon, Mar 2008 
Come the Night, Oct 2008

Val Cache Series
Prince of Wolves, Sep 1999 
Prince of Dreams, Feb 1995 
Prince of Shadows, Aug 1996

Western/Victorian Werewolf Series
Touch of the Wolf, Oct 1999 
Once a Wolf, July 2000 
Secret of the Wolf, Oct 2001 
To Catch a Wolf, Sep 2003 also in Call of the Wolf 
To Tame a Wolf, May 2005 also in Call of the Wolf 
Bride of the Wolf, Mar 2010 
Luck of the Wolf, Nov 2010 
Code of the Wolf, Aug 2011

Stand Alone Novels
Star Crossed, Aug 1995 
Twice a Hero, June 1997 
Body & Soul, Aug 1998

Anthologies and collections

References

fantasticfiction.co.uk - Susan Krinard

External links
Susan Krinard's home page
The Romance Club/Susan Krinard

Year of birth missing (living people)
Living people
21st-century American novelists
American fantasy writers
American women novelists
Women science fiction and fantasy writers
21st-century American women writers